Pramod Nainwal is an Indian politician from Uttarakhand and a Member of the Uttarakhand Legislative Assembly. He represents the Ranikhet Constituency. Pramod is a member of the Bharatiya Janata Party.

Political Life and career 
Pramod Nainwal was born in a Bhatrojkhan in Ranikhet and educated at the village school.

References 

1972 births
Bharatiya Janata Party politicians from Uttarakhand
Members of the Uttarakhand Legislative Assembly
Uttarakhand MLAs 2022–2027
People from Almora district
Living people